The 1978 NSWRFL season was the 71st season of the NSWRFL Premiership, Sydney's professional rugby league football competition, and Australia's first. Twelve clubs, including six of 1908's foundation teams and another six from around Sydney competed for the J.J. Giltinan Shield and WD & HO Wills Cup during the season, which culminated in a grand final between the Manly-Warringah and Cronulla-Sutherland clubs that was drawn and had to be re-played. NSWRFL teams also competed for the 1978 Amco Cup.

Season summary
This season video citing was introduced for incidents of foul play that are not detected on the field. Twenty-two regular season rounds were played from March till August, resulting in a top five of Western Suburbs, Cronulla-Sutherland, Manly-Warringah, Parramatta and Canterbury-Bankstown who battled it out in the finals.

Mick Cronin set a new record for most points scored by an individual in Australian club rugby league history with his tally of 282 points from 25 games in 1978. This record would stand for another twenty years. He also broke Arthur Oxford's 1920 record for consecutive goals with 26 in a row.

In a tragic accident during the match between Penrith and Newtown at Henson Park on 28 May, rookie Panther prop John Farragher broke his neck in a scrum and was left a quadriplegic.

The 1978 Rothmans Medallist was Parramatta centre Mick Cronin. Rugby League Week gave their player of the year award to Parramatta forward Geoff Gerard.

The 1978 season was also the last in the playing career of future Australian Rugby League Hall of Fame inductee, Ron Coote.

Teams

Ladder

Finals
Manly finished the regular season in the relatively strong position of equal second with Cronulla, three points behind minor premiers Wests. However after Cronulla beat Manly 17-12 in the qualifying final, every game from that point was a sudden-death fixture for the Sea Eagles.

The second week of finals saw Manly come from 3-13 behind Parramatta to draw 13-13 in the semi-final requiring a mid-week replay. Again in that match Parramatta led (11-2 this time), before Manly stormed home with three late tries in ten minutes to win 17-11. In the week following the game, Parramatta unsuccessfully attempted to have the match annulled and replayed due to Manly scoring a try on what was discovered to be a seventh tackle, a mistake by referee Greg Hartley.

Manly then had to back up a few days later to play a fresh Wests side in the preliminary final. Thus far the Magpies had only played one final to Manly's three. Wests had two tries disallowed by referee Greg Hartley. Manly coach Frank Stanton somehow coaxed a courageous effort out of his exhausted players and on field, five-eighth Alan Thompson was inspirational as they triumphed 14-7 and reached the grand final.

Chart

* - Indicates only the replay match, and not the match ending in a draw.

Grand final

In the grand final, Cronulla went to a 9-4 lead in the second half before Manly came back to hit the front 11-9. A Steve Rogers penalty goal squared the scores at 11-11 but he then missed a desperate late field-goal attempt and at full-time the scores remained locked. Thus, for the second consecutive season, the weary grand finalists were required to play a rematch. Although, on this occasion, the NSWRFL were forced to hold the replay three days later on the Tuesday instead of the following weekend due to the imminent 1978 Kangaroo tour, with the Australian team due to leave for England that weekend. The drawn grand final also forced the Australian Rugby League to hold off on naming the touring Kangaroos squad until after the replay, with as many as twelve players from Manly and Cronulla in contention to be selected.

Manly 11 (Tries: Mooney. Goals: Eadie 4.)

Cronulla 11 (Tries: Edmonds. Goals: Rogers 4.)

Grand final Replay 

The Tuesday rematch in front of 33,552 was Manly's sixth game in twenty-four days. It was the second Grand final in a row to end up going into a mid-week replay with the 1977 Grand final between St George and Parramatta also needing a re-match to decide the Premiers after the original game had been a 9-9 draw.

In the first half Cronulla had no answer to Graham Eadie's blind-side bursts. His display completely routed the hapless Sharks and Manly went to the break holding a 15-0 lead thanks to a try by Eadie in the scoreboard corner, one he set up for centre Russel Gartner in the same corner, and another 65 metre effort by Gartner after a sweeping backline movement saw him run into open space and easily outpace the Sharks’ defence to score in front of the Sheridan Stand.

The only point in the second half came from a field goal by Eadie.

In the replay, as throughout their extraordinary finals campaign, Manly were inspired by the leadership of captain Max Krilich and coach Frank Stanton, their iron-man Terry Randall who had required numerous pain killing injections before every game of the finals just to be able take the field in what Frank Stanton called sheer mind over matter, their cool five eighth Alan Thompson and classy fullback and Man of the Match Graham Eadie.

As of the 2019 NRL Grand final, no player since Eadie has scored the combination of a try, a goal and a field-goal in a grand final.

The refereeing of Greg "Hollywood" Hartley in the replay and throughout the 1978 Finals series attracted criticism from coaches Roy Masters, Jack Gibson and Terry Fearnley, all of whom appealed to the NSWRFL to prohibit Hartley from refereeing their clubs' matches the following season.

Manly-Warringah 16 (Tries: Gartner 2, Eadie. Goals: Eadie 3. Field Goal: Eadie.)

Cronulla-Sutherland 0

Man of the Match: Graham Eadie
Venue: Sydney Cricket Ground
Attendance: 33,552
Referee: Greg Hartley

Player statistics
The following statistics are as of the conclusion of Round 22.

Top 5 point scorers

Top 5 try scorers

Top 5 goal scorers

References

External links
Rugby League Tables - Season 1978 Rugby League Tables
Results: 1971-80 at rabbitohs.com.au
1978 J J Giltinan Shield and WD & HO Wills Cup at rleague.com
NSWRFL season 1978 at rugbyleagueproject.org

New South Wales Rugby League premiership
NSWRFL season